Muszaki Abu Bakar (born 15 March 1989, in Selangor) is a Malaysian footballer who plays for Malaysia Premier League club, Perlis FA as a right-back.

External links
 
 Muszaki Statistics

Malaysian footballers
Living people
1989 births
People from Selangor
Perlis FA players
Negeri Sembilan FA players
Association football fullbacks